Ramón Mariano Fernández Lera (1949–2022), better known as Chete Lera, was a Spanish actor. With a long on-screen career in addition to a stage career, he featured in films such as The Red Squirrel, Secrets of the Heart, Familia, Barrio, Open Your Eyes, Flores de otro mundo, and Full Moon.

Biography 
Ramón Mariano Fernández Lera was born in 1949 in A Estrada, Province of Pontevedra. He was raised for most of his childhood in Corcubión, and then moved to Madrid. Prior to acting he was an aeronautic engineer, pilot, bank teller and studied psychology. He began a career as a stage actor in the late 1970s, including his performance in the Eduardo Fuentes-directed stage play Cabaret Castizo (premiered in Madrid on 5 January 1993), portraying a sheriff making a parody out of authoritarian Madrid city councillor Ángel Matanzo; Matanzo's attempts to bring down the play eventually prompted his own sacking from the municipal government board. One of his most well known film credits was that of the psychiatrist in Alejandro Amenábar's Abre los ojos.

He won the Silver Biznaga for Best Actor in the 2002 Málaga Film Festival together with the rest of the cast of Smoking Room.

His television work includes performances in Los ladrones van a la oficina, Médico de familia or Cuéntame cómo pasó. His last television work was his performance as Ramón in Mira lo que has hecho.

He died on 19 May 2022, age 72, in the wake of a car accident in Rincón de la Victoria. He was the single occupant of a vehicle that went off the road and fell down a 50-metre steep slope, landing on a plantation.

Filmography 

Film

Television

Accolades

References 

1949 births
2022 deaths 
Road incident deaths in Spain
20th-century Spanish male actors
21st-century Spanish male actors
Spanish male television actors
Spanish male stage actors
Male actors from Galicia (Spain)
Spanish male film actors